Kurtzer is a German and Jewish surname. Notable people with the surname include:
 Daniel C. Kurtzer (b. 1949), U.S. ambassador 
Yehuda Kurtzer American Jewish public intellectual
 Ryan Kurtzer, English baseball player
 Edda Blanck-Kurtzer, known as Molly Luft

German-language surnames
Jewish surnames